Dwight Stone (born January 28, 1964) is a former American football running back, wide receiver, and kick returner in the National Football League (NFL) for the Pittsburgh Steelers, the Carolina Panthers, and the New York Jets for 14 years.  Stone originally signed with Pittsburgh as an undrafted free agent in 1987. Stone was the only undrafted free agent to make the  opening day roster. He was an outstanding special teams gunner and kick returner for eight years with the Steelers. He was timed at 4.20 in the 40 yard dash and bench press 225 (28). Former Steelers coach Chuck Noll said that Stone had “Beep Beep”speed and was"the fastest player I've ever coached over 40 yards." And he, was selected to the All Undrafted Steelers Team (May 2021). He played college football at both Middle Tennessee State University and Marion Military Institute as a running back and averaged 7 yards per rush and scored over 40 touchdowns in his college career.  He played high school football at Florala High School. In 1999 Dwight was selected as the winner of the New York Jets, Marty Lyons Award for Community Service, given to the player who gives from the heart through charity and community involvement

After retiring from the NFL, he became a police officer for the Charlotte Mecklenburg Police Department in Charlotte, NC where he served as a school resource, patrol officer & a field force officer for 15 years. In 2007-2008 Officer Stone was Right Moves for Youth Volunteer of the Year. He retired from CMPD in 2015.

References

Living people
1964 births
American football wide receivers
Carolina Panthers players
Middle Tennessee Blue Raiders football players
New York Jets players
Pittsburgh Steelers players
People from Florala, Alabama